Jordan Houlden (born 25 July 1998) is an English diver from the City Of Sheffield Diving Club. He is a silver medalist of the 2022 European Diving Championships.

Career

Houlden won at the ASA National Age Group Championships in 2010, silver in the Group C 1m Springboard. He made progress through the junior rankings, including winning Group B 1m gold with the ASA England Programmes team at the 2013 Trofeo Niccolò Campo in Rome.

After making his European Junior debut in 2014, Houlden was one of the standout English junior divers in 2015, winning Group A 1m gold at the British Elite Junior Championships. In June 2015 he competed at the inaugural 2015 European Games in Baku, finishing fourth in the 3m Springboard despite not diving five months prior due to breaking his thumbs. He became 2015 ASA England Programmes Athlete of the Year for diving. In May 2016 he was part of the British team at the 2016 LEN European Aquatics Championships.

He competed for England at the 2022 Commonwealth Games where he won a silver medal in the men's 3 m springboard event, a bronze medal in the men's 1 m springboard event and came 8th in the mixed 3 m springboard event.

References

1998 births
Living people
English divers
Divers at the 2015 European Games
European Games competitors for Great Britain
Divers at the 2022 Commonwealth Games
Commonwealth Games medallists in diving
Commonwealth Games silver medallists for England
Commonwealth Games bronze medallists for England
Sportspeople from Sheffield
Medallists at the 2022 Commonwealth Games